Nanilla terrestris is a species of beetle in the family Cerambycidae. It was described by Zayas in 1975. It is known from Cuba.

References

Parmenini
Beetles described in 1975
Endemic fauna of Cuba